The Estado Falcón worm snake (Amerotyphlops lehneri) is a species of snake in the family Typhlopidae. The species is endemic to Venezuela.

Etymology
The specific name, lehneri, is in honor of geologist Ernst Lehner.

Geographic range
A. lehneri is found in the Venezuelan state of Falcón.

Habitat

Description
A. lehneri is a small species of blind snake. It has 20 scale rows around the body. Dorsally, it is yellowish with 11 brown lines. Ventrally it is yellow. The rostral and the tail spine are bright yellow.

Reproduction
A. lehneri is oviparous.

References

Further reading
Dixon JR, Hendricks FS (1979). "The wormsnakes (family Typhlopidae) of the neotropics, exclusive of the Antilles". Zoologische Verhandelingen (173): 1–39. (Typhlops lehneri, p. 19).
Freiberg M (1982). Snakes of South America. Hong Kong: T.F.H. Publications. 189 pp. . (Typhlops lehneri, p. 119).
Rivas GA, Molina CR, Ugueto GN, Barros TR, Barrio-Amorós CL, Kok PJR (2012). "Reptiles of Venezuela: an updated and commented checklist". Zootaxa 3211: 1–64.
Roux J (1926). "Notes d'erpétologie sud-américaine ". Revue Suisse de Zoologie 33 (4): 291–299. (Typhlops lehneri, new species, pp. 298–299). (in French).

lehneri
Snakes of South America
Reptiles of Venezuela
Endemic fauna of Venezuela
Reptiles described in 1926
Taxa named by Jean Roux